Mullion Creek is a locality in the central west of New South Wales, Australia, in Cabonne Shire, near Orange.

It is a quiet town with a school, hall and church.  The church is going through debate about a cemetery next to the Roman Catholic church.  It is also quite famous for sightings of large orange cats that many people have thought to be cougars, which have been accused of killing local livestock.

The name of the town is odd because there is no designated creek in the town. SEE BELOW:

There is a creek at Mullion Creek, it is to the north and runs through the area. It is called Mulyan Creek and can be found on Google Earth-the GPS Co-ordinates are 33°08'13'S 149°07'08'E. It is at an elevation of 863m.<Google Earth URL: https://earth.google.com/web/search/mullion+creek+NSW+australia/@-33.13699472,149.11910549,863.23278899a,50.42345264d,35y,-0h,0t,0r/data=CigiJgokCdAA5kUhOwtAESU90iyKrEHAGcocB4kKwVVAIaS4N6dzYWbA>

School
Mullion Creek Public School

Church
St Brendan's Catholic Church

Towns in New South Wales
Towns in the Central West (New South Wales)
Cabonne Council
Main Western railway line, New South Wales